Laurence Marks may refer to:
Laurence Marks (British writer) (born 1948), British TV writer
Laurence Marks (American writer) (1915–1993), American writer for radio and television shows including M*A*S*H
Laurence Marks (journalist) (1928–1996), British journalist for The Observer and The Sunday Times
Laurence D. Marks (born 1954), American professor of materials science and engineering
Lawrence K. Marks, New York judge

See also
Laurence Mark (born 1949), American film producer